The European Box Lacrosse Championship (EBLC) is the international men's box lacrosse championship organized by the Federation of International Lacrosse (FIL) and European Lacrosse Federation (ELF) that occurs every four years.

The EBLC had its first championship event in Turku, Finland between July 8 – 15, 2017 and had 14 participating nations, competing for the EBLC 2017 Gold medal at two arenas – Gatorade Center and the Marlie Areena.

Due to the COVID-19 pandemic, the EBLC 2021 was delayed to the following year. It was held between July 30 – August 6, 2022 in Hanover, Germany. Official sources preferred using the german way of spelling Hanover as "Hannover".

Editions

2017 EBLC Championship 
.
14 teams competed for the first ever European Box Lacrosse Championships in Turku. Teams were divided into three groups, two of them being top groups based on current ranking, Karelia and Kalevala, with Granite group filled with the lower ranked teams.

Kalevala Group 
Israel, Ireland, Turkey, Serbia.

Karelia Group 
England, Czech Republic, Finland, Germany.

Granite Group 
Sweden, Poland, Switzerland, Netherlands, Austria, Slovakia.

Israel defeated the Czech Republic 8–7 in the gold medal game of the 2017 European Box Lacrosse Championship in Turku, Finland. John-Luc Chetner of Israel was named tournament MVP.

2022 EBLC Championship 
.
14 teams competed for the second European Box Lacrosse Championships in Hanover. Teams were divided into four groups and played in two arenas, at the DHC Hannover e.V. and in the huus de groot – EISARENA Mellendorf.

Group A 
Belgium, Finland, Serbia, Sweden.

Group B 
Czech Republic, Germany, Poland, Slovakia.

Group C 
Austria, Netherlands, Switzerland.

Group D 
England, Ireland, Scotland.

Awards

2017 
Top Scorer: John-Luc Chetner, Israel
Defensive MVP: Michael Shea, Ireland

Winners

Performance by team

Medal table

Performance by tournament

See also 
 Federation of International Lacrosse
 Women's Lacrosse World Cup
 Under-19 World Lacrosse Championships (men and women)
 World Indoor Lacrosse Championship (men)
 World Junior Lacrosse Championship (men)
 Box lacrosse

References

External links 
Federation of International Lacrosse official website
2017 EBLC official website
2017 EBLC Stats
2022 EBLC official website
2022 EBLC Stats

European Lacrosse Championships
Recurring sporting events established in 2017